Totes Meer (German for "Dead Sea") is a 1941 oil-on-canvas painting by Paul Nash. It depicts a moonlit landscape populated by a graveyard of crashed aircraft of the German Luftwaffe.  The broken shards of metal from the wings and fuselages resemble a seascape of jagged ice, possibly inspired by Caspar David Friedrich's The Sea of Ice.  It measures  and has been in the collection of the Tate Gallery since 1946.

Background
Nash was an official war artist in the First and Second World Wars.  In 1940, he was asked to work for the Air Ministry, and Nash started work on Totes Meer that year.  Some representatives of the Air Ministry disliked his style of art, and his full-time position was terminated before the end of the year.  Totes Meer was completed in 1941, and offered to the War Artists' Advisory Committee in 1941.  Nash was paid £150 for the painting.

Description
The work was based on sketches and photographs made at the Metal and Produce Recovery Unit at Cowley near Oxford in August 1940, where the remains of both German and British crashed aircraft were brought to be recycled at the Morris Motors car factory nearby, which was being used to construct and repair aircraft.  Nash wrote that, under moonlight, the sea of wreckage could be perceived to move and twist, but in reality it was of course dead, and the only movement was the flight of a white owl, depicted near the horizon at the right.

The desolate landscape harkens back to the paintings that Nash made as a war artist in the First World War, such as We are Making a New World or The Menin Road.  The mournful tone may also have been influenced by his personal circumstances: an affair with painter Eileen Agar was coming to an end, and Nash was suffering from a respiratory illness which ultimately caused his death.

Nash initially called the work Iron Sea, but he hoped that the work could be reproduced on postcards to be sent to Germany as propaganda and decided on a German title instead. Nash described his painting:

Reception
Kenneth Clark, chairman of the War Artists' Advisory Committee, described Totes Meer as "the best war picture so far" and the painting was an immediate success when it was displayed in an exhibition of National War Pictures at the National Gallery in May 1941.  It was presented to the Tate Gallery in 1946 and is considered to be one of the most important British paintings of the Second World War.

References

External links
Art in War: Exploring a Painting, BBC,  11 April 2005
Totes Meer (Dead Sea), Tate Gallery
Totes Meer (Dead Sea), Tate Gallery catalogue entry
Story of a Masterpiece: Paul Nash: Totes Meer, Tate Gallery, 1 February 2008
Artists of World War II, Barbara McCloskey, p. 81

1941 paintings
War paintings
Collection of the Tate galleries
Paintings by Paul Nash
Moon in art
Aviation art